Penfield, Georgia, United States was established shortly after 1829 in Greene County, and named in honor of Josiah Penfield (c. 1785 – 1828), a Savannah merchant and silversmith, who bequeathed $2,500.00 and a financial challenge to the Georgia Baptist Convention to match his gift for educational purposes. The convention, led by Billington Sanders, organized a manual labor school which opened in 1833 as Mercer Institute (renamed Mercer University in 1837), in honor of Rev. Jesse Mercer of Greene County, a major contributor to the matching gift request.

As the university grew, a Female Academy (1838), post office, bank, mercantile stores, print shops, Male Academy Preparatory School (1847), hosiery mill, and cotton warehouses opened on the 450 areas that surrounded the campus. Residential housing, influenced by the requirement that homes provide housing for students, added to the charm of this typical southern community.

Before long, the Christian Index, Temperance Banner, Georgia Illustrated Magazine and The Orion were all being published in Penfield. Hard times brought on by the American Civil War, however, initiated the school's move to Macon in 1871 and the village of Penfield survived on the strength of the cotton industry.

Today, the village of Penfield is distinguished by the Greek Revival architecture of Old Mercer Chapel, community churches, town cemetery, and Victorian homes that flourished until 1919 when the prosperity built during the "Cotton Era" was ended by the boll weevil.

Ruins of the town's mercantile buildings, bank, post office and Mercer Institute's (science building, dormitory, Phi Delta Literary Society Hall, Ciceronian Hall and others) can be seen next to the still-functioning chapel located just above the old town square along East Main Street. Penfield Cemetery, located a short distance from Penfield Road, on the North end of Cemetery Road, holds the remains of many community leaders. One is noted Baptist minister Jesse Mercer, namesake of the university. Another is (Frances) Etta Colclough Whelchel, a member of the first class of women to graduate from the University of
Georgia, who was instrumental in founding the university's first Y.W.C.A. branch and served as its first president, and later ran the Colclough family's Penfield farm.

In 1976, the village of Penfield was added to the National Register of Historic Places in recognition of its contributions to architecture, education and religion from 1825 to 1874. The area now known as the Penfield Historic District comprises 305 acres (1.2 km), including Old Mercer Chapel (now Penfield Baptist Church), Sanders Chapel, Penfield Presbyterian Church, Penfield Cemetery and over a dozen notable houses. Behind the wall of the Penfield Cemetery, lies a Slave Cemetery, that desperately needs attention. There are some markers still standing, mostly indentations on the ground, and unless you walk down and look over the fence of the nice manicured lawn, you wouldn't even know it's there. The road to it has been blocked.

The Penfield Historic District is located seven miles (10 km) north of Greensboro on GA 5925 (commonly known as Penfield Road).

Directions: From Atlanta travel east on Interstate 20 approximately 73 miles (117 km) to Greensboro (exit 130). Exiting the interstate, turn left onto GA-44/Lake Oconee Parkway. Follow GA-44 2.7 miles (4.3 km) into Greensboro. Turn right at the first traffic light onto East Broad St./ GA-12/GA-15. Turn left at first traffic light onto N. East St. for 1.5 miles (2.4 km).  N. East St. becomes Penfield Rd./GA 5925.  Follow Penfield Rd. 5.8 miles (9.3 km) into Penfield.

References
 History of Greene County, Georgia 1786-1886 by Thaddeus Brockett Rice and Carolyn White Williams(Washington, GA: Wilkes Publishing Co., Inc., 1973)
 Penfield Driving Tour brochure produced by Penfield House and Gardens for the Greene County Chamber of Commerce, 118 North Main Street, Greensboro, GA 30642
 National Register of Historic Places.com - Registration #76000637
http://www.nationalregisterofhistoricplaces.com/ga/greene/state.html
 Greetings from a co-edby Carol Bishop, Beyond the Pages, Volume 20 Fall 2014, page 16.
https://www.libs.uga.edu/development/newsletter/beyondthepages_f14_final_lo.pdf

Unincorporated communities in Greene County, Georgia
Unincorporated communities in Georgia (U.S. state)